Gao Jindian (October 1939 – 13 December 2018) was a Chinese army officer and politician, lieutenant general of the People's Liberation Army (PLA).

He was a member of the 10th National Committee of the Chinese People's Political Consultative Conference.

Biography
Gao was born in Jinan, Shandong in October 1940. He graduated from the Dezhou No. 2 High School. In 1960 he joined the Communist Youth League of China. He enlisted in the army in July 1962, and joined the Communist Party of China in 1970. He joined the National Defence University of People's Liberation Army in 1986, and was promoted to vice president in 1998.

He was promoted to the rank of major general (shaojiang) in 1995 and lieutenant general (zhongjiang) in 1999.

On December 13, 2018, he died of illness in Beijing, aged 79.

References

1939 births
2018 deaths
Politicians from Jinan
PLA National Defence University alumni
People's Liberation Army generals from Shandong
People's Republic of China politicians from Shandong
Chinese Communist Party politicians from Shandong